Jolly Jumper is a horse character in the Franco-Belgian comics series Lucky Luke, created by Belgian artist Morris. Described as "the smartest horse in the west" and able to perform tasks such as chess-playing and tightrope walking, Jolly Jumper accompanies his cowboy in their travels across the Wild West, and delivers frequent quips. In the Greek version of the series, Jolly Jumper is female and is called "Dolly". In the Turkish Version the character is called "Düldül".

Publication history
Jolly Jumper first appeared alongside Lucky Luke in the story Arizona 1880, published in the Almanach issue of the Franco-Belgian comics magazine Spirou on December 7, 1946. In his earlier appearances, he was more like a real horse, which started to change after René Goscinny became the series' main writer.

Analysis and reception
The absurdity of the intelligent talking horse Jolly Jumper juxtaposed against the appearances of many real historical figures has been described as contributing to the humor and charm of the comic series.

Nándor Bokor described Jolly Jumper as the "true soulmate" of the main character Lucky Luke.

See also
 List of fictional horses

Sources

 Lucky Luke publications in Spirou and Pilote BDoubliées 

Footnotes

Further reading

External links
Lucky Luke official site 

Comics characters introduced in 1946
Western (genre) comics characters
Fictional horses
Lucky Luke
Comic book sidekicks
Anthropomorphic animal characters
Belgian comics characters